Unai López Cabrera (born 30 October 1995) is a Spanish professional footballer who plays for Rayo Vallecano as a central midfielder.

Club career
Born in Errenteria, Gipuzkoa, López joined Athletic Bilbao's youth system in 2011 at the age of 14 from neighbouring Real Sociedad, after starting out at Antiguoko. He made his debut as a senior with the farm team in the 2012–13 season in Tercera División, and in June 2013 was promoted to the reserves in Segunda División B.

López was called up to the main squad by manager Ernesto Valverde on 2 July 2014, for pre-season matches. In August he was also added in the B list for the campaign's UEFA Champions League, being awarded the number 29 jersey.

On 27 August 2014, López was named on the bench for the Champions League play-off match against S.S.C. Napoli. He made his first-team debut the following day, coming on as a substitute for Markel Susaeta in the 72nd minute of a 3–1 home win and also providing an assist to Ibai Gómez in the last goal. His La Liga bow took place on the 30th, when he featured 23 minutes in the 3–0 defeat of Levante UD also at the San Mamés Stadium.

On 26 July 2016, after a season back at the B side in Segunda División, López was loaned to CD Leganés for one year. On 1 August of the following year, he moved to second tier club Rayo Vallecano on a one-year loan deal.

López scored his first competitive goal for Athletic on 8 March 2020, from a free kick to open a 4–1 away league victory over Real Valladolid. He featured regularly during the 2019–20 campaign, but subsequently fell down the pecking order after the emergence of newer youth prospects such as Oihan Sancet, Unai Vencedor and Oier Zarraga.

On 31 August 2021, López returned to Rayo on a three-year contract; Athletic retained a first refusal clause on any future transfer, while also receiving "a series of economic compensations".

Career statistics

Club

Honours
Rayo Vallecano
Segunda División: 2017–18

Athletic Bilbao
Copa del Rey runner-up: 2019–20, 2020–21

References

External links

1995 births
Living people
People from Errenteria
Sportspeople from Gipuzkoa
Spanish footballers
Footballers from the Basque Country (autonomous community)
Association football midfielders
La Liga players
Segunda División players
Segunda División B players
Tercera División players
Antiguoko players
CD Basconia footballers
Bilbao Athletic footballers
Athletic Bilbao footballers
CD Leganés players
Rayo Vallecano players
Spain youth international footballers
Spain under-21 international footballers